The 2016–17 Denver Pioneers men's basketball team represented the University of Denver during the 2016–17 NCAA Division I men's basketball season. The Pioneers, led by first-year head coach Rodney Billups, played their home games at Magness Arena and were members of The Summit League. They finished the season 16–14, 8–8 in Summit League play to finish in a three-way tie for fourth place. They lost in the quarterfinals of the Summit League tournament to South Dakota State.

Previous season
The Pioneers finished the 2015–16 season 16–15, 7–9 in Summit League play to finish in sixth place. They defeated Nebraska–Omaha in the quarterfinals of The Summit League tournament to advance to the semifinals where they lost to South Dakota State.

On March 11, head coach Joe Scott was fired. He finished at Denver with a nine-year record of 146–132. On March 14, the school hired Rodney Billups as head coach.

Roster

Schedule and results

 
|-
!colspan=9 style=| Non-conference regular season

|-
!colspan=9 style=| The Summit League regular season

|-
!colspan=9 style=| The Summit League tournament

References

Denver Pioneers men's basketball seasons
Denver